Geena may refer to:

 Geena Davis (born 1956), American actress, producer, writer, athlete, and former fashion model
 Geena Gregory, a character in the soap opera Coronation Street

Feminine given names